Oswaldo Kuster Neto (born 26 April 1965) is a Brazilian rower. He competed at the 1988 Summer Olympics and the 1996 Summer Olympics.

References

1965 births
Living people
Brazilian male rowers
Olympic rowers of Brazil
Rowers at the 1988 Summer Olympics
Rowers at the 1996 Summer Olympics
Place of birth missing (living people)
Pan American Games medalists in rowing
Pan American Games bronze medalists for Brazil
Rowers at the 2003 Pan American Games